The Origins Awards are American awards for outstanding work in the gaming industry. They are presented by the Academy of Adventure Gaming Arts and Design at the Origins Game Fair on an annual basis for the previous year, so (for example) the 1979 awards were given at the 1980 Origins.

The Origins Award is commonly referred to as a Calliope, as the statuette is in the likeness of the muse of the same name. Academy members frequently shorten this name to "Callie".

History 
Originally, the Charles S. Roberts Awards and the Origins Awards were one and the same. Starting with the 1987 awards, the Charles S. Roberts were given separately, and they moved away from Origins entirely in 2000, leaving the Origins Awards as a completely separate system. In 1978, the awards also hosted the 1977 H. G. Wells awards for role-playing games and miniature wargaming.

Categories 

The Origins Awards were initially presented at the Origins Game Fair in five categories: Best Professional Game, Best Amateur Game, Best Professional Magazine, Best Amateur Magazine and Adventure Gaming Hall of Fame.

Since the first ceremony, the game categories have widened to include Board games (Traditional, Historical and Abstract), Card games (Traditional and Trading), Miniature wargaming (Historical, Science Fiction and Fantasy), Role-playing games and play-by-mail games. There are additional categories for Graphic Design, for game expansions and accessories, and for game-related fiction. During the 1980s and 1990s, awards were also given to Computer games. Starting in 2003, the Origins Awards began a new category called the Vanguard Award, which honored highly innovative games.

Hall of Fame

Members 

  Aaron Allston
  Dave Arneson
  Richard Berg
  Jolly R. Blackburn
  Larry Bond
  Gerald Brom
  Darwin Bromley
  Bob Charrette
  Frank Chadwick
  Vlaada Chvátil
  Loren Coleman
  Greg Costikyan
  Liz Danforth
  James F. Dunnigan
  Larry Elmore
  Mike Elliott
  Don Featherstone
  Nigel Findley
  Richard Garfield
  Don Greenwood
  Ed Greenwood
  Julie Guthrie
  E. Gary Gygax
  Tracy Hickman
  John Hill
  David Isby
  Steve Jackson (US)
  Jennell Jaquays
  Reiner Knizia
  Wolfgang Kramer
  Eric M. Lang
  Rick Loomis
  Rodger MacGowan
  Tom Meier
  Marc Miller
  Dennis Mize
  Alan R. Moon
  Sandy Petersen
  Michael Pondsmith
  Alex Randolph
  Charles Roberts
  Sid Sackson
  Duke Seifried
  Tom N. Shaw
  Redmond Simonsen
  Kenneth St. Andre
  Michael Stackpole
  Greg Stafford
  Lisa Stevens
  Klaus Teuber
  Don Turnbull
  Jonathan Tweet
  Jim Ward
  Margaret Weis
  Jordan Weisman
  Loren Wiseman
  Reinhold Wittig
  Erick Wujcik
  Lou Zocchi

Games and publications 

 Ace of Aces
 Acquire
 Advanced Dungeons & Dragons *
 Amber Diceless Roleplaying
 Apples to Apples
 Axis & Allies
 Battletech Mechs & Vehicles
 Berg's Review of Games
 BoardGameGeek
 Call of Cthulhu
 Champions
 Chivalry & Sorcery
 Cosmic Encounter
 The Courier
 Diplomacy
 Dragon Magazine
 Dungeons & Dragons *
 Empire
 Fire & Movement Magazine
 GURPS
 Illuminati play-by-mail game
 Mage Knight
 Mage Knight Board Game
 Magic: The Gathering
 Middle-Earth Play-By-Mail
 Mythos
 Nuclear War
 Paranoia
 Risk
 The Settlers of Catan
 Squad Leader
 Star Fleet Battles
 Strategy & Tactics
 Traveller
 TwixT
 Vampire: The Masquerade
 Warhammer Fantasy Battle
 Warhammer 40,000
 Yahtzee

* - Dungeons & Dragons and Advanced Dungeons & Dragons were deemed different enough to be inducted on separate occasions.

See also 
 Charles S. Roberts Award
 Spiel des Jahres
 Diana Jones Award
 ENnie Awards
 List of Game of the Year awards
 Deadlands, eight-times Origins Award-winning

References

External links 
 
 Boardgamegeek — List of winners from 1990 to 2018

Game awards